Air Annobón is an Equatoguinean airline. It began operations in January 2013 with flights between Malabo and Bata. Flights were operated by wet leased BAe 146-300s until the airline purchased its own BAe 146-200. As of September 2016, Air Annobón has suspended operations; it is searching for a joint venture partner with whom to resume flights as a low-cost carrier.

History 

Air Annobón was founded in 2012 and received its first aircraft, a BAe 146-300, in July 2012. The airline launched operations on 25 January 2013 with a flight between Malabo and Bata. An additional BAe 146-300 arrived at a later date. Both aircraft were wet leased from South African company Fair Aviation. In 2014 Air Annobón took delivery of a BAe 146-200, which it had purchased itself. The aircraft replaced the wet leased BAe 146-300s.

Ch-aviation reported in September 2016 that Air Annobón had suspended operations but that it was seeking to restart them as a low-cost carrier with a joint venture partner, who would need to provide aircraft., there are no news on a restoration of the airline so far, it seems definitely out of business.

Corporate affairs
Air Annobón is owned by Cándido Nsue Okomo, director of state oil company GEPetrol and brother of President Teodoro Obiang Nguema Mbasogo's wife. The airline has its headquarters in San Antonio de Palé, the capital of Annobón Province. Its slogans include "Quality, punctuality and safety" and "The airline that brings you closer to those you love most", which appear in a 2014 advertisement.

Operations
In March 2014, Air Annobón was operating flights between Bata and Malabo with a single BAe 146-200.

See also
 List of airlines of Equatorial Guinea

References

External links

Airlines of Equatorial Guinea
Airlines established in 2012
2012 establishments in Equatorial Guinea
Annobón